"Love Struck" is a song by American boy band V Factory. It is their first official single from their debut album.

Song information
The song was written by David Jassy and Darin Zanyar. The single was released on iTunes on February 3, 2009.

Music video
The music video for "Love Struck" was released officially on May 22, 2009 on AOL Music.

Track listing
Promo Remixes

 "Love Struck" (Main Version) — 4:05
 "Love Struck" (Extended Version) — 6:06
 "Love Struck" (Jason Nevins Club Mix) — 8:15
 "Love Struck" (Dave Aude Club Mix) — 7:05
 "Love Struck" (Tracy Young Club Mix) — 7:55
 "Love Struck" (Gomi & RasJek Club Mix) — 7:37

Release history

Charts

References

External links
 VFactoryMusic.com Official Website

V Factory songs
2009 debut singles
Music videos directed by Scott Speer
Songs written by David Jassy
Song recordings produced by Twin (production team)
2009 songs
Reprise Records singles
Songs written by Darin (singer)